The House That £100k Built is a British factual television series that was first broadcast on BBC Two on 18 September 2013. The programme was commissioned for a second series as well as a new series - The House that £100k Built: Tricks of the Trade in January 2014.

Episode list

Series 1

Reception
Express & Star was disappointed by the series, saying the problem was that it was "obsessed with the budget, and cost cutting, and this made it a little depressing" and it "did not have the drama of some of the other house building programmes". Time Out gave the series two stars out of five.

Calor was concerned by a scene in the series showing how to recycle a gas cylinder as a light fitting. It warned of the dangerous nature of the activity and illegality. The scene was subsequently removed from the programme and BBC iPlayer. However the scene will be included on the Australian release, 7Two stating that it is common practice in Australia already.

International broadcast 
 - On air promotions airing on 7Two from 9 January 2015 indicate the series will be airing on the channel in early 2015.
 - Netflix and Amazon Prime began streaming the program to the North American market in late 2019 early 2020.

References

External links
 
 

2013 British television series debuts
Television shows set in the United Kingdom
English-language television shows
Television series by Endemol